Nalus (also Romanized as Nālūs) is a city in, and the capital of, Nalus District of Oshnavieh County, West Azerbaijan province, Iran. At the 2006 census, its population was 2,488 in 533 households. The following census in 2011 counted 2,938 people in 669 households. The latest census in 2016 showed a population of 2,973 people in 778 households.

References 

Oshnavieh County

Cities in West Azerbaijan Province

Populated places in West Azerbaijan Province

Populated places in Oshnavieh County